Islami Andolan Bangladesh is one of the biggest Islamist political party in Bangladesh. It was founded in 1987 by Fazlul Karim as Islami Shashontantra Andolan (Islamic Constitutional Movement), and took its current name in 2008. Its student wing is Islami Chhatra Andolan Bangladesh.

They have campaigned in favour of a blasphemy law and organised rallies in support for a restoration of the caretaker government of Bangladesh, as well as demanding punishment of former government minister Abdul Latif Siddiqui for his comments criticizing Hajj and Muhammad.

Islami Andolon Bangladesh (IAB) has submitted a memorandum to the UN demanding an end to the violence in Rakhine state of Myanmar. Prior to departing Baitul Mukarram, party leaders Mufti Syed Rezaul Karim had delivered speeches condemning the atrocities against the Rohingya in Myanmar.

IAB announced to lay siege to the Prime Minister's Office on 25 April 2017 demanding arrest of 'atheist bloggers who insulted Islam ' and to pass law for punishing those who 'insulted Islam in the parliament'.

Leaders of IAB have rejected proposals of both Prime Minister Sheikh Hasina and BNP Chairperson Khaleda Zia regarding the election-time government, saying the proposals are defective and cannot resolve the ongoing political crisis.
They urged the government to dissolve the parliament and hand over the power to a neutral caretaker government for holding a credible election.

In the 11th parliamentary elections, the Islami Andolan Bangladesh (IAB) has bagged the third highest number of votes, following Awami League-led Grand Alliance and BNP-led Jatiya Oikya Front.

Islami Andolan Bangladesh's "move alone policy", rejecting the two main alliances led by top two parties, is bringing fruits at last, as the party's performances in several city corporation polls held recently show a sharp rise in number of votes bagged by the party candidates.
The IAB, founded more than three decades ago, has made a continuous progress in local polls over the past three years. Late Maolana Syed Muhammad Fazlul Karim, pir of Charmanai, established the party on 13 March 1987.
In the recently held Khulna city polls, the party candidate got more votes than Jatiya Party, the sitting opposition in the parliament, securing third position with 14,363 votes while JP's runner got 1,500 votes only.
Mentionable, IAB also secured the third-highest number of ballots in Dhaka South and North, Narayanganj, and Ranpaur city corporation polls.
Terming the recently-held local government polls unfair, IAB Amir Sayed Rezaul Karim said, “People could have seen the genuine face of the party’s popularity had there been fair polls.”
Commenting on politics of ballot, the IAB Amir said, “People want freedom from the incumbent oppressive and autocratic ruler. In their frantic search for a peaceful society, the people are not being able to find out any alternative solution. That’s why they are stretching their hands to an Islamist party like us. They are joining the islamist movement by growing day by day.”
“People are showing more interest to IAB as they found no alternative,” claimed the Pir of Charmanai.
Unlike other Islamist parties, IAB has been mobilizing its organisational capacity across the country. Its founder late Fazlul Karim was a popular and well accepted figure all over the country. He set up organisational units in all the 64 districts.

The Islami Andolon Bangladesh is going ahead in the 'vote politics' silently. This religion-based party is gradually doing well in the local government elections adopting 'walk alone' policy not being a part of any alliance. The number of votes of the party has increased also in the national polls.
Hundreds of activists of Islami Andolon Bangladesh (Dhaka city unit) gathered at the north gate of Baitul Mukarram National Mosque after Jumah prayers
Islami Andolon Bangladesh demonstrated in Dhaka's Baitul Mukarram National Mosque area on Friday, protesting against the Citizenship (Amendment) Act (CAA) and National Register of Citizens (NRC) in India.Hundreds of activists of Islami Andolon Bangladesh (Dhaka city unit) gathered at the north gate of Baitul Mukarram National Mosque after Jumah prayers.
They chanted slogan: "No CAB, no NRC, and stop torturing Muslims in India". They also chanted “Where is humanity?

See also 
 List of Deobandi organisations

References

External links

1987 establishments in Bangladesh
Islamic political parties in Bangladesh
Islamist groups
Far-right politics in Bangladesh
Political parties established in 1987
Political parties in Bangladesh
Chormonai movement
Deobandi organisations